Vidya Subramaniam (born 1957) is a Tamil author. She has been writing novels and short stories for close to three decades. Born and brought up in Mylapore, she has to her credit 100 books and has won awards including a Tamil Nadu State Award.
 
An anthology of her short stories has been translated into English titled Beyond the Frontier. Two of her short stories have also been translated and featured in a book titled Anthology of Tamil Pulp Fiction from the Blaft stable.

References

External links
Vidya Subramaniam's blog

Tamil-language writers
Indian women novelists
Indian women short story writers
Writers from Chennai
Living people
1957 births
20th-century Indian short story writers
Women writers from Tamil Nadu
20th-century Indian novelists
20th-century Indian women writers
Novelists from Tamil Nadu